Chernigovsky Uyezd or Uyezd of Chernigov was one of the subdivisions of the Chernigov Governorate of the Russian Empire. It was situated in the southwestern part of the governorate. Its administrative centre was Chernigov (now Chernihiv, Ukraine).

Demographics
At the time of the Russian Empire Census of 1897, Chernigovsky Uyezd had a population of 162,123. Of these, 86.1% spoke Ukrainian, 7.6% Yiddish, 5.6% Russian, 0.2% Polish, 0.2% Belarusian, 0.1% Tatar, 0.1% German and 0.1% Romani as their native language.

References

 
Uyezds of Chernigov Governorate
Chernigov Governorate